Nana Darkoa Sekyiamah is a Ghanaian feminist writer and blogger.  She co-founded award-winning blog Adventures from the Bedrooms of African Women and has written for The Guardian and Open Democracy. Sekyiamah is the Director for Communications manager at the Association for Women's Rights in Development and a member of the Black Feminism Forum Working Group which organised the historic first Black Feminist Forum in Bahia, Brazil.

Life 
Nana Darkoa Sekyiamah was born in London, England, to Ghanaian parents, and grew up in Ghana. She has a diploma in performance coaching and a certificate in conflict mediation and has worked as a life coach and a public speaker.  She was also awarded a Bachelor of Science degree in communications and cultural studies by the University of North London and a Master of Science degree in gender and development from the London School of Economics and Political Science.  She has also worked as a leadership trainer for London's Metropolitan Police.

Sekyiamah co-founded the blog, Adventures from the Bedrooms of African Women, to help widen discussion of sex and sexuality by African women and provide a forum for them to talk openly.  She won the best overall blog and best activist blog prizes at the 2013 Ghana Blogging and Social Media Awards and best overall blog again in 2014.  In March 2011, Sekyiamah was recognised by Arise magazine as one of "Ghana's Change Makers".  Sekyiamah  is the convener for Fab Fem, a feminist group that meets regularly in Accra.

Sekyiamah has written articles for The Guardian, This Is Africa and Open Democracy.  She wrote the Communications Handbook for Women’s Rights Organisations and has had short stories published in anthologies in many countries.  Sekyiamah has written widely on the sexuality of African women and has also had an article ("Standpoint: Adventures from Our Bedrooms – Blogging about diverse erotic experiences") published in the peer-reviewed academic journal Feminist Africa.

Sekyiamah works as the Director of Communications at the Association for Women's Rights in Development (AWID).  She is a member of the Black Feminism Forum Working Group.  She co-authored Creating Spaces and Amplifying Voices: The First Ten Years of the African Women's Development Fund on the early history of the fund.  She also wrote Women Leading Africa: Conversations with Inspirational African Women, a collection of interviews with women from across Africa on topics including feminism, politics and the arts that came about through her work with the AWDF.

Sekyiamah was a speaker at the 2015 Writivism Festival in Kampala, Uganda, and the 2016 Aké Arts and Book Festival in Abeokuta, Nigeria.

In 2021, Sekyiamah had an anthology entitled The Sex Lives of African Women published by Dialogue, described in a review by Margaret Busby as "an extraordinarily dynamic work". A stage adaptation was subsequently performed in Nairobi, Kenya.

In December 2022, Sekyiamah was named on the BBC's 100 Women list as one of the world's inspiring and influential women of the year.

References

External links 
 Adventures from the bedrooms of African women blog
 Fiona Leonard, "Nana Darkoa Sekyiamah: Opening doors to African women's bedrooms", Global Voices, 31 March 2011.

Alumni of the London School of Economics
Alumni of the University of North London
Ghanaian bloggers
Ghanaian businesspeople
Ghanaian women activists
Ghanaian women bloggers
Ghanaian women writers
Living people
Year of birth missing (living people)
BBC 100 Women